The Lithuanian A Lyga 2002 was the 13th season of top-tier football in Lithuania. The season started on 6 April 2002 and ended on 9 November 2002. 9 teams participated with FBK Kaunas winning the championship.

League standings

Results

First half of season

Second half of season

Relegation play-off 

|}

See also 
 2002 LFF Lyga

References 

LFF Lyga seasons
1
Lith
Lith